Kitty K. Brennan (born May 17, 1950) is an American lawyer and retired judge.  She served on the Wisconsin Court of Appeals from 2008 to 2019 in the Milwaukee-based District I.  Earlier in her career, she served 14 years as a Wisconsin Circuit Court Judge and worked as an assistant district attorney in Milwaukee County.

Biography 

Born in Milwaukee, Wisconsin, Brennan received her bachelor's degree from University of Wisconsin–Madison and her J.D. degree from University of Wisconsin Law School. Brennan began her legal career as an assistant district attorney in the office of the Milwaukee County District Attorney.  In 1984, she left the office and went into private practice in the firm Murphy & Brennan.

She was elected to the Wisconsin Circuit Court in 1994, defeating George W. Greene in the spring election that year.  Greene had been appointed to the role 7 months before the election to replace Judge Robert W. Landry, who had retired.  She was re-elected to the circuit court in 2000 and 2006.  In 2005, she was appointed Chief Judge of the 1st Judicial Administrative District by the Wisconsin Supreme Court.  She was re-appointed to a second two years term as Chief Judge in 2007, but in 2008 Governor Jim Doyle appointed her to the Wisconsin Court of Appeals after the death of Judge Ted E. Wedemeyer, Jr.  She was re-elected to the Court of Appeals without opposition in 2009 and 2015.  She was Presiding Judge for District I from 2016 to 2018.

Judge Brennan was named "Judge of the Year" in 2006 by the State Bar of Wisconsin.  She retired in 2019 and was succeeded by Judge Joe Donald.

Personal life and family
Judge Brennan is married to Joseph G. Murphy, they have four children.

Electoral history

Wisconsin Circuit Court (1994, 2000, 2006)

| colspan="6" style="text-align:center;background-color: #e9e9e9;"| General Election, April 5, 1994

Wisconsin Court of Appeals (2009, 2015)

| colspan="6" style="text-align:center;background-color: #e9e9e9;"| General Election, April 7, 2015

References

External links
 Kitty Brennan on Ballotpedia

1950 births
Living people
Lawyers from Milwaukee
University of Wisconsin–Madison alumni
University of Wisconsin Law School alumni
Wisconsin state court judges
Wisconsin Court of Appeals judges
21st-century American judges
21st-century American women judges